Following is a list of diesel locomotives built by the Montreal Locomotive Works, a Canadian subsidiary of the American Locomotive Company from 1904-1964.  From 1964-1975 the company was known as MLW-Worthington and was owned by Bombardier from 1975 until its closure in 1985.

Switchers (S series)

Cab units (FA & FP series)

Early roadswitchers (RS, RSC, RSD series)

RS series (B-B)

RSC series (A1A-A1A)

RSD series (C-C)

Later road switchers

4-axle units

6-axle units

DL series

HR series (actually Bombardier)

LRC series

TURBO series 
See also MLW TURBO

References

Roberts, E.W. and D.P. Stremes (Eds.). Canadian Trackside Guide 2004 Bytown Railway Society, Ottawa, ON.  ISSN 0829-3023

MLW locomotives
MLW

pt:Locomotivas ALCo